Driss El Mrabet (born 26 January 1967) is a Moroccan football manager and former player who manages Ittihad Tanger. A midfielder, he played at international level, competing at the 1992 African Cup of Nations.

Honours

Manager
Al-Ittihad Club (Salalah)
Oman First Division League: 2012–13
Al-Oruba SC
Omani League: 2007–08
Oman Super Cup: 2008
IR Tanger
Botola: 2017–18

Individual
 Botola Best Manager of the Season: 2017–18.

References

1967 births
Living people
People from Tangier
Moroccan footballers
Association football midfielders
Ittihad Tanger players
S.U. Sintrense players
Al-Orouba SC players
Dibba FC players
Moroccan football managers
Ittihad Tanger managers
Moroccan expatriate footballers
Moroccan expatriate sportspeople in Portugal
Expatriate footballers in Portugal
Moroccan expatriate sportspeople in Oman
Expatriate footballers in Oman